8th Army is a board game published in 1982 by Attactix Adventure Games.

Contents
8th Army is a game in which the North African campaigns from December 1940 to January 1943 are depicted.

Reception
Norman Smith reviewed 8th Army for Games International magazine, and gave it 3 stars out of 5, and stated that "If you are interested in the wider aspects of land warfare by including the whole Mediterranean scene and the interrelationships between land, naval and air forces then 8th Army is a good buy."

Reviews
Fire & Movement #40 & 43

References

Board games introduced in 1982